Indianapolis Braves were an American soccer team, the men's professional team of the Indianapolis-based soccer organization, FC Pride, which competed in the National Premier Soccer League (NPSL), the fourth tier of the American Soccer Pyramid, for just one season, in 2007.

Their playing squad included defender Eric Descombes, a current full international player for Mauritania who played in both of that country's 2006 FIFA World Cup qualifying games against Zimbabwe in 2003, and former professionals John Swann, Brian Brooks and Moussa Dagnogo.

Year-by-year

External links
 Indianapolis Braves (FC Pride page)
 Indianapolis Braves profile on NPSL site

National Premier Soccer League teams
Braves
Defunct soccer clubs in Indiana
2007 establishments in Indiana
2007 disestablishments in Indiana
Association football clubs established in 2007
Association football clubs disestablished in 2007